Beachamwell is a village and civil parish in the Breckland district of Norfolk, England about  south west of Swaffham and  east of Downham Market. It has four ancient churches, two of them in ruins. The former parish of Shingham has been annexed.

Name
The name as spelt is the official one, but the alternative Beechamwell is found in modern publications as well as in historical sources. The correct spelling was a source of dispute in the village, until a parish council meeting in 1977 decided the matter.

Geography

The village is at the northern extremity of the Breckland and so its soil is light and sandy, free-draining and easily losing its fertility. This made traditional farming difficult, and so the north of the parish is occupied by Beachamwell Warren, once one of the most important mediaeval rabbit warrens in the Breckland. Some of the boundary earthworks can still be traced. However, the historical heathland here has mostly been lost, and the parish land use is now mostly either modern arable farming or conifer plantations (50% each for the Warren), with a few semi-natural woodland areas – especially along a brook marking the southern boundary of the parish. The topography is flat.

The location is rather isolated, and the main access is a country lane running south-west of Swaffham as Beachamwell Road, looping north-west to join the A1122 east of Fincham which goes on to Downham Market. The core of the village itself is south of this lane, around a rectangular village green at the far end of a connecting street called Chestnut Walk, with the church of St Mary at the west end and a pub at the east end. Church and pub are connected by The Street, on which are a few early 19th-century houses; the K6 phone box at the east corner of the churchyard is a Listed Building. The former post office is just beyond the church, at 24–25.

The Street continues as a narrow lane, which branches to the neighbouring villages of Barton Bendish to the west and Gooderstone and Oxborough to the south, also Stoke Ferry to the south-west with a connection to the A134. Chestnut Street continues south of the green as the dead-end Old Hall Lane, to the ruined church of All Saints. South of St Mary's churchyard is a row of houses called The Green, with the former school at the west end and the village hall on the actual green at the east end.

To the west of Chestnut Walk is another lane passing through the hamlet of St John's with a second ruined church, and in between the two is the deer park of Beachamwell Hall. The mansion was rebuilt in 1906 after a fire, but the original 18th-century stables, ice-house and ha-ha survive.

To the east of the village is the tiny hamlet of Shingham, which used to be a separate parish and which retains its own church building, St Botolph's. The hamlet of Drymere is strung along the road to Swaffham. It was created for forestry workers when the Warren was afforested.

According to the 2011 census the village had a population then of 339, including Shingham.

History

Early days
The parish has been the source of a rich collection of archaeological finds, mostly obtained by fieldwalking or metal-detecting.
The light, easily worked soil was attractive to Neolithic farmers, and large numbers of worked flints have been recovered. A possible cursus exists just south-west of the All Saints church ruin.

A small menhir of uncertain date, called the Cowell Stone, marks the meeting point of the parishes of Beachamwell, Swaffham and Narborough. It has been moved a short distance from its original location, on a track leading north of the A1122 to Narford, and is no longer upright.

Numbers of Bronze Age artifacts have also been found, notably a copper alloy hammer near Lodge Farm. There are at least nine round barrows in the parish, and two of these are noted on the Ordnance Survey: South-east of Shingham, and at Hangour Hill on the A1122. The latter location had at least one other barrow, and could have been a cemetery.

Iron Age pottery has been found in fieldwalking, also a possible chariot linchpin near the Roman road mentioned below.

Romans
The A1122 to the east of Fincham follows the course of a Roman road that connected the Fen Causeway with Venta Icenorum (the present Caistor St Edmund), and ran through Beachamwell Warren. Roman-era finds have been rich, but no remains of Roman buildings have been identified. A trove of four pewter dishes were found during ploughing at Shingham Farm to the west of Shingham Wood in 1968, and a very unusual T-shaped brooch decorated with red enamel in the same general area in 1995. Two coin hoards were found in the 19th century. A site near the village called Decoy Close revealed a Roman cemetery with five burials, and also a rich assemblage of finds from the Neolithic through all eras into the Mediaeval.

Saxons
The Devil's Dyke is a linear bank and ditch running in an almost straight line from Narborough to near Oxborough, parallel to the western boundary of the parish, and this is postulated as an early Saxon boundary marker. The date is not conclusive, however. The “Decoy Close” site mentioned above is postulated as an early Saxon burial ground owing to the richness of the metalwork finds here, but no burials have been found yet.

The church of St Mary is described as originally late Saxon, although the listed building description does not commit as to whether any of the surviving fabric is of this date.

The Domesday Book of 1086 listed three Saxon settlements in the present parish: Bicham (Beacham), Wella (Well) and Shingham. There was a church in Bicham, taken to be St Mary's. Wella had two mills and was around the later church of All Saints, which was not mentioned in Domesday – although a fragment of a Saxon stone cross was found incorporated into later fabric here.  These two places were in the Hundred of Clackclose. Shingham was very small, with two households. Its settlement was in the Hundred of Clackclose, but part of the parish was in the Hundred of South Greenhow with the brook running through it being the boundary.

Medieval
Beacham and Well consolidated to become Beachamwell when the settlements became contiguous in the early Middle Ages. Deserted medieval village earthworks around the All Saints church ruin, and in what is now Nut Wood, indicate that the resulting village was at least twice the size that it is now.  There were three manors, called Well-Hall, Chervile’s and Ashfield and Joce’s; the latter two were named after families which had held them. Chervile's Manor included that part of Shingham in the Clackclose Hundred, and also had St Mary's Church.

All Saints’ church was built in the 12th century,  as was Shingham church. However St John's seems to have been a later foundation, since the first rector (priest in charge) was recorded in 1304 and the surviving fabric is of that period. It was attached to Well-Hall Manor.

The farming of rabbits on an industrial scale at Beachamwell Warren was first recorded in about 1275, and continued in importance for five hundred years.

Early modern
At the Reformation, there were four territorial parishes in the present parish area: Beachamwell St Mary, Beachamwell St John, Beachamwell All Saints and Shingham. However, St John's church did not survive. It was still in use in 1535, but abandoned by 1552. Despite this, because the priest-in-charge was a rector, he had a guaranteed income from the property, so a rector were appointed to the ruined church until 1723. The post was a sinecure. In about 1750, the antiquary Francis Blomefield paid a visit, and found that some poor people were living in huts within the ruin.

All Saints’ church also seems to have fallen into decay, but it was restored in 1612 by Thomas Athow, the Lord of the Manor of Well-Hall, and the family used it as a mausoleum. However, it was abandoned in 1688 when the roof collapsed. The problem allegedly arose when the Athow family sold the manor, for the new Lord declined to accept responsibility for the upkeep of the whole church (the Lord of the Manor was responsible for the chancel only). The church was in ruins by 1721, and Blomefield was indignant about the dereliction when he visited around 1750.

The three manors were consolidated into one country estate by 1760, based on Beachamwell Hall, which was rebuilt and provided with an ornamental deer-park. The Warren was enclosed by Act of Parliament in 1777; although rabbits were still reared, it was recorded in 1785 that much of the Warren had been arable farmland for some time. The Beachamwell Estate owned almost all the land in the Beachamwell and Shingham parishes, in the form of a few large tenant farms (there was only one in Shingham, called Shingham Farm).

In 1765, the rector of St Mary's found two Nottingham alabaster relief sculptures under the floor of the church's chancel. Francis Blomefield saw these, and described them as painted and gilded. One depicted the Deposition from the Cross, and the other showed St Peter. These were probably from one or both of the two altars in the church in medieval times, and were hidden at the Reformation. Their present whereabouts seem to be unknown.

In 1685 a Huguenot family named Motteux had fled Rouen in France for the City of London, in response to the Edict of Fontainebleau of that year ending any toleration of Calvinism in France. They did well (Peter Anthony Motteux was a noted playwright), and a descendant named John Motteux bought the Estate in 1780. He was a keen gardener, and propagated a new variety of eating apple called Beachamwell Seedling. This still exists and is available (2021) as a heritage variety.

John died in 1793, and his son inherited who was also called John.

19th century
Shingham church was united with St Mary's in 1800, becoming a chapel of ease.

John Motteux the younger was a beneficent landlord, and improved the village. The timber-framed cottages were replaced with brick ones, beginning in 1815 (which is why the domestic buildings in the village lack interest). In 1832 the south aisle of St Mary's church was extended by him, and given a new lead roof. In 1835 he provided a school, the village's first. He died in 1843, and his monument is in the church.

The village pub, called the Cooper's Arms, was first licensed in 1846.

In 1851 the Estate was sold to Joshua Fielden, a descendant of the parliamentarian John Fielden and a member of a family running a cotton spinning and weaving business as Fielden Brothers at Waterside Mill, Todmorden, Lancashire. The Estate was originally bought as an investment, but Joshua's son (also called Joshua) contracted an “unsuitable” marriage and was banished to here as the resident squire in 1875. He hated it so much that he drank himself to death in 1892, but his widow inherited, remarried and her descendants kept possession until 1966.

In 1871, the population of the three Beachamwell parishes was 376 and Shingham had 78. The village had a post office, a shop, a shoemaker, a resident surgeon, the pub and a smithy next door. The pub was a beerhouse (it didn't sell wine or spirits), and the publican was also the blacksmith. The school was extended in 1875. Unusually, school dinners were provided at the pub until 1972 when the village hall took over as a venue.

In 1883, Shingham church's roof was reported as being in thatch over the nave, and slate over the chancel. Only the latter was in use as a mortuary chapel for the graveyard, but the former was derelict. Services had ceased, and the altar was moved to St Mary's.

A reading room was opened in a village cottage in 1891. A Wesleyan Methodist chapel was opened in 1892, on the lane to Shingham.

The Local Government Act 1894 created the civil parish and parish council of Beachamwell by merging the three ancient parishes, to be part of the Swaffham Rural District Council.

20th century
In 1902 a fire completely destroyed the Hall, and this was rebuilt in 1906 in the Queen Anne style by the architects Wimperis and Best. No photograph of the old mansion has been traced, so it is not known if the rebuilding resembled the original edifice.

In 1911, the roofless nave of Shingham church was re-roofed in corrugated iron, subsequently replaced with copper sheeting. It was then used for services until 1941.

After the First World War, a demobbed army hut was acquired for use as a village hall and re-erected on the village green.

In 1924 the Forestry Commission bought  of the former Warren from the Beachamwell Estate, and planted conifers on it. The forestry workers were provided with the new hamlet of Drymere, built along the road to Swaffham.

In 1927 the Cooper's Arms (formerly a free house) was bought by the Norwich brewers Steward & Patteson. It had the nickname of the “Hole in the Wall”, because of a hatch allowing the sale of takeaway beer to those waiting outside.

The 1926 revision of the Ordnance Survey documented the beginning of the 20th-century expansion of the village, which lead to a ribbon of housing along the east side of Chestnut Walk as far as the Swaffham Road junction.

In 1935 Shingham civil parish was annexed to that of Beachamwell, creating the parish boundaries extant today.

The Royal Observer Corps had a monitoring post on a lane called Narborough Hill (east side), which had an Orlit A post. This was in operation during the Cold War, from 1959 to 1991.

In 1963, a proper village hall was built to replace the old army hut, and was named the Memorial Hall so as to do duty as the village's war memorial. It took over as a venue for school dinners from the pub in 1972, and continued this function until 1983.

In 1967, the pub became the property of Watneys Brewery of London when it took over Steward & Patteson Brewery. Watneys closed the pub in 1974, part of a deeply resented policy of closing down village pubs by the company which had a monopoly in Norfolk. However, the pub here was re-opened as a free house called the “Great Danes Head” in 1977. It was again renamed as the “Great Dane Country Inn” in 2004.

In 1976, the ownership of Shingham church was transferred to the Estate and so it ceased to be a working church. It had been disused since 1941. However the graveyard was kept and is now the cemetery of St Mary's, because the latter's own graveyard is full.

In 1996 the school had to close down, owing to the number of children attending having dropped to nine.

21st century

The Post Office became unviable economically, and so was closed down. It was replaced by a mobile post office, visiting the village for twenty minutes or so on four days a week.

The lead roof on the south aisle of the church, re-laid by John Motteux the younger in 1832, was stolen in 2019, and this closed the church until repairs could be undertaken. Scaffolding was put up to aid the lead installation. The congregation had already dwindled to single figures by then, and was incapable of maintaining the building on its own. So, it was decided to abandon regular services and only hold them on the major feasts of the Christian calendar. It was hoped, however, to keep the church open daily for visitors with the help of a rota of volunteers.

The church was gutted by fire in February 2022, losing its thatched roof.

Governance
Beachamwell Parish Council has a limited responsibility for local amenities, and advises Breckland District Council as regards planning and service issues.

The parliamentary constituency is South West Norfolk.

Social amenities

The village's main social amenity is the village hall. The village green is used as a recreation ground. The pub is now (2021) a Licensed Guest House, and the bar and restaurant are open in the evening only. The village has lost its shop, post office and school.

Transport

Rail
The nearest railway station is Downham Market. There is no connecting bus service. Before its railway closed in 1968, Swaffham station was closest.

Bus
The village's bus service, number 31, is run by West Norfolk Community Transport under its “Go To Town” banner. It runs into Swaffham on Saturday mornings only. For a return journey, one has to make a request (2021). The time available in town is just over two hours.

Churches

Church of St Mary the Virgin

Overview
Beachamwell St. Mary is a Grade I listed building, and one of 124 existing round-tower churches in Norfolk. St Mary's is the last surviving working church of the four that once served this parish territory. It is in the Diocese of Ely.

A significant fire destroyed the roof on 2 February 2022.

It was previously considered that the extant church was constructed in the late Saxon period, but new evidence indicates that the tower at least was erected post-Conquest (see description of tower, below). However, the nave interior gives witness to this tower having been added to a pre-existing building, so a late Saxon attribution to the west wall of the nave is reasonable.

The church was substantially re-modelled in the Perpendicular style in a campaign covering the 14th and early 15th centuries. This involved the addition of a south aisle, a decorative north doorway with a porch, replacement windows and a new bell-chamber for the tower. There was a restoration in 1832, and another one of the chancel at the end of the 19th century.

The plan comprises a nave of two bays with the round tower at the west end, a north porch, a chancel, and a south aisle which extends alongside the chancel giving an arcade of four bays overall (this extension was built in 1832).

The edifice is built from flint, formerly mainly rendered in lime plaster, but much of this has fallen off, and what is left is in poor condition. There is some ashlar stonework, especially used as quoins, and also some brick dressings. Random ashlar rubble and brick also exists in the exposed wall fabric. There are both thatch and lead roofs.

Tower

The round tower looks like being built in the early 11th century. But new insights show that it is more probable that it was built in the 12th century by pre-Conquest workmen using their old fashioned style. This is due to the fact that the north and west of the four pairs of former sound-holes have triangular heads made of Barnack stone set on their flint jambs. Barnack stone was not available until the 12th century. This discovery throws into doubt the age of many other putatively late Saxon churches whose dating depends on stylistic features such as this.

The tower is a flint cylinder, formerly rendered, which displays evidence that it was built in two stages because there is a slight setback about halfway up. A two-light Perpendicular window faces west from the ground floor. The original sound-holes are very small and in pairs, one pair for each cardinal direction and in different styles. Those facing west and north have triangular tops, while those facing east and south have arched tops. The pair facing west has a dividing colonnette in the form of a bulbous baluster and with oversized astragal mouldings. The pair facing north have a dividing slab which is a re-used late Saxon grave-slab with carved interlace.

A replacement bell-chamber was put on top of the old tower in the 14th century. This is octagonal, in fine flintwork using split flints and with flushwork in limestone. Four faces each have a two-light sound-hole, the bottom part blocked with brickwork and the rest given a brickwork lattice in the form of tessellated equilateral triangles. The other four sides each have flushwork in the form of two-light window tracery.

First reports after the fire indicate that they are undamaged.

There is a clock on the tower, facing north.

Exterior
The nave and chancel are of the same width, but the roof of the latter is slightly lower. Both are thatched, with one combined pitch for the south side but two pitches on the north side to accommodate the height difference. On the north side, the west corner of the nave has quoins in long-and-short work which is considered an Anglo-Saxon architectural feature. The single 15th-century Perpendicular window has a flat top and tracery.
The north porch is 15th century, with a simple two-light window without decoration in each side. The roof is in pantiles. The unusual stepped false gable in brick is later. The portal is a moulded pointed arch, with the inner order of mounding supported by a pair of engaged colonnettes. The actual doorway has double  ogee moulding.

The north side of the chancel has two large stepped buttresses, one at the corner, and a single, simple two-light window with a triangular top. In between the buttresses is a blocked doorway which used to lead out into a vestry, now demolished. Francis Blomefield described this in the 18th century as having originally been two-storey with a stone staircase and a lead roof, but the internal floor of the second storey had been removed by his time.

The large three-light east window, in geometric style with a crowning quatrefoil, is late 19th century.

The south aisle has a lead roof with a shallow pitch. The west part is 15th century, the east part early 19th century (the colour of the flintwork gives this away). Each corner has a massive diagonal buttress, with a third one where the original east corner used to be. The older part has two two-light windows and a moulded arched doorway with a hood mould, while the newer part has two three-light windows. One of these faces east. These two windows are medieval salvage; it is likely that they were at the end of the original aisle and in the south wall of the chancel originally. There is also a Baroque wall monument commemorating Robert Harvey, who died in 1740, and his family.

Interior fabric

The interior is in white, including the blank plaster vaulted ceiling which covers both nave and chancel despite the difference in height outside. There is no chancel arch, but Francis Blomefield noted that there was still a surviving wooden rood screen in the 18th century. The 14th-century early Perpendicular nave arcade has two arches, with a central quatrefoil column with a capital, double ogee moulded archivolts and a pair of responds with matching capitals. The arcade is continued by two 1832 arches flanking the chancel, which have more simple moulding and no capitals. In contrast to the other two arches, these two are plastered.

The north wall of the chancel has an ornate moulded doorway, now blocked, which used to lead into the (now demolished) vestry. The south wall of the aisle has the piscina of the original medieval altar which was here before the aisle was extended. This now houses a polychrome painted head-and-shoulders stone bust of St Mary the Virgin, donated to the church.

The floor is in small hexagonal tiles and locally made bricks.

The tower arch is regarded as the original west doorway, before the tower was added. It has a rough semi-circular arched top, with the voussoirs exposed. Above it, and just off the major axis to the south, is a Sanctus bell window (the inserted vaulted ceiling cuts through the top of this). This enabled someone in the tower to ring the church bell at the Elevation during Mass. The offset position would allow this to be done for Masses at both the main and aisle altars.

Stained glass

The church now has two stained glass windows. The main east window commemorates Joshua and Frances Fielden 1936 and in a leadlight style, mostly in clear and gold with quarries in diaper and embellished with roses. The figurative motif for the three main lights consists of three angels holding a ribbon with the text of the first lines of the Sanctus: "Holy, Holy, Holy, Lord God of hosts; heaven and earth are full of your glory." The smaller lights above have shields bearing the initials of Jesus Christ, but the two central ones have little angels holding shields reading S M for “Saint Mary”.

The aisle window is in a more familiar Victorian style showing Christ with disciples, although dated 1902 and installed to the memory of Claxton Billing Mason.

Francis Blomefield noted that there were surviving pieces of old stained glass in the 18th century. In a north window near the pulpit was a heraldic shield: Azure, a lion rampant or, bearing in his dexter paw a cross crosslet bottony fitché, argent. He described this as of the family of Beckingham. In the south window of the aisle (removed for the new arcade in 1832) were two upper lights depicting St Augustine of Canterbury and St Dunstan.

Monuments

There are two brasses in the chancel floor. Both commemorate priests, one anonymous late 14th century and the other John Grymeston who died 1430. Blomefield in the 18th century noted a brass matrix of a priest wearing vestments in the floor of the aisle, but the brass inlays had been robbed.

There is a pair of wall monuments in the chancel to John Motteux (died 1793) and John Motteux his son (died 1843). They are in a neoclassical style, but each is set beneath a medieval crocketted ogee arch with carved head stops and fleurons. The source of these recycled items is unknown. Similarly, a wall tablet to Joshua and Frances Fielden 1936 on the north wall of the nave is set below a moulded pointed arch.

Graffiti

The church is famous for its medieval graffiti, most of all for the depiction of a devil on the medieval arcade column, known as the 'Beachamwell Devil'.  Also there a lady in a wimple, and an apparent inventory of building materials used by masons in construction.

Fixtures and fittings
The church's main altar was brought from Shingham church in the late 19th century, when the latter was derelict. The side aisle altar doubles up as a strongbox, in cast iron with eight octagonal legs and sides in intricate fretwork. The top is of oak bordered with brass, with an inscription stating that it was designed by John Motteux in 1835. The manufacturer was the firm of Joseph Bramah.

Instead of a more familiar basin font, the church has a “pillar font” which consists of a low octagonal pillar with a small and shallow saucer cavity in the top of its capital. It was provided in the 1832 restoration. The medieval font of the ruined All Saints’ church was brought here in 1867, but was not then used.

The wooden pulpit is Jacobean, 17th century, and is set in front of the blocked doorway into the former vestry. The Victorian choir stalls incorporate a re-used 17th-century lectern.

February 2022 fire
The thatched roof of the church caught alight on 2 February 2022. The fire is believed to have been started by a spark from lead welding that was being carried out by workmen on the roof. The church was extensively damaged with the thatched roof, windows and fittings destroyed.  It has been confirmed that the church was insured and that insurance will pay for the resoration, but with a shortfall.  Most of the written records and most of the valuable items have been recovered intact, although the Baptismal records appear to have been lost.  The bells remain in the tower, but the bell frame will have to be examined. If the frame is damaged the bells may have to be sent down.  A statement from the Diocese of Ely contained: "The immediate next steps will be to clear the church of debris, secure the building and determine with expert advice how to protect the walls and the remaining stain glass work."  The fate of the famous Beachamwell Devil is unknown due to the difficulty of access.

 the main structure of the church is sound. All the debris has been removed along with the floor brasses, stained glass windows, clock and bells. The walls have been repaired and protected pending the delivery of the new roof.

Church of St Botolph, Shingham

History
 
Shingham church is a Grade I listed building. The dedication is to St Botolph.

It was built in the 12th century, but was substantially modified in the 14th century, with lesser works in the previous and subsequent centuries. It was originally a parish church, but was united with St Mary's in 1800, becoming a chapel of ease. However, as such it was not kept in repair. In 1883, the church's roof was reported as being in thatch over the nave, and slate over the chancel. Only the latter was in use as a mortuary chapel for the graveyard, but the former was derelict. Services had ceased, and the altar was moved to St Mary's.

In 1911, the roofless nave of Shingham church was re-roofed in corrugated iron, subsequently replaced with copper sheeting which also replaced the slate chancel roof. It was then used for services until 1941, when it became disused again. In 1976, the ownership of the redundant building was transferred to the Estate and so it ceased to be a working church. However the graveyard was kept and is now the cemetery of St Mary's, because the latter's own graveyard is full.

As a 'working' cemetery the churchyard is open access, but the church itself is the private property of Beachamwell Estate, and is only open to the public on occasion.

Exterior

The edifice is in flint, with substantial areas of rotting render surviving. The plan is on a simple rectangle, and there is no distinction between nave and chancel. The copper sheet roof covers both. Each corner has a diagonal step buttress, and the north wall also has two angled buttresses and one step buttress. There is no tower, but the stump of a bell-cote occupies the western gable. Francis Blomefield noted that the bell-cote arch still existed in the mid 18th century, but that there was no bell.

The fenestration is completely mismatched, of differing dates. The otherwise blank west wall has a 14th-century cusped lancet, in a rectangular frame with a transom. The south wall has, from west to east, a loop window, a wide lancet, a two-light window with cusped Y-tracery and a transom and a 15th-century two-light window with a horizontal lintel and transom. The large east window is 14th century, with three lights and three quatrefoils. The north wall has a single two-light window with Y-tracery, and a blocked pointed doorway with a chamfered stone frame.

In contrast with the simplicity of the rest of the building, the main Norman south doorway is ornate. The arch has three nested orders, the inner one being the doorcase which has no imposts and chip carving on the voussoirs. This is framed by two arches brought forward in turn, and originally resting on columns with scalloped capitals. The column shafts have been lost. The middle arch has roll moulding, and the outer one has zig-zag moulding. The latter is framed by a chip-carved hood mould springing from a pair of stops carved with animals’ heads.

Interior
The interior is simple, with the walls in white and no stained glass. The floor is in brick. The roof timbers are modern. There is a stoup by the door, a 13th-century piscina in the south wall of the chancel, and an arched aumbry opposite.

There is no distinction between nave and chancel, although Francis Blomefield noted a chancel screen when he visited in the 18th century.

Medieval pews have survived, with poppyhead ends and tracery cut into the backs. One surviving arm rest shows a shepherd with his dog. The double-decker pulpit is 17th century, with fine carving, and the communion rails are of the same period.

Church of All Saints (ruin)

History

Beachamwell All Saints' Church was built in the 12th century, but stonework found in the ruin indicates that it was remodelled in the 14th and 15th centuries. After the Reformation it seems to have fallen into decay and there is evidence of a fire, but it was restored in 1612 by Thomas Athow, the Lord of the Manor of Well-Hall. His family then used it as a mausoleum. However, it was abandoned again in 1688 when the roof collapsed.

The problem allegedly arose when the Athow family sold the manor, for the new Lord declined to accept voluntary responsibility for the upkeep of the whole church (the Lord of the Manor was legally responsible for the chancel only). The church was a ruin by 1721, and Francis Blomefield was indignant about the dereliction when he visited then.

There was an excavation in 1867, which recovered the medieval font, which was taken to St Mary's. The last part of the ruin with architectural details was lost in 1989, when the west wall collapsed. In the rubble was found a re-used fragment of a wheel-headed Saxon cross.

The ruin is a Grade II listed building.

Description
The ruin is beyond the end of Old Hall Lane, which becomes a byway before it passes close by the church in its field – even though this used to be the village's direct route to Oxborough.

The plan was rectangular, with no tower, and the chancel having the same width as the nave. Francis Blomefield in 1721 reported that the walls were still standing, together with a “very neat” chancel arch, but that “weeds, briars, elders &c. growing therein”. The fabric was flint, with some ashlar and brick.

Blomefield mentioned two extant funerary monuments. One was on the north wall, anonymous, within an arch and in the form of a “floral pyramid”. The other was a “very stately” monument in the north-east corner of the chancel, in marble and alabaster and rising above a tomb-chest. This had belonged to the Athow family, and he expressed his disgust at its vandalized state as well as detailing the substantial heraldic displays on it.

Before 1989 the west wall stood almost to its full height, to the roof gable. It had a three-light Gothic window with the tracery missing, and a blocked pointed doorway. The stone of the doorcase had been robbed out, leaving two holes either side of the blocking. On the façade was a heraldic shield displaying Athow impaling Wingfield and the date 1612, indicating that at least this wall was substantially rebuilt then.

After the collapse of this wall in 1989, what remained were three separate shapeless fragments of nave walling standing to some height, two on the south side and one on the north. The latter had shared a corner with the collapsed west wall, which had left a pile of rubble. The outline of the rest of the church could be discerned under the grass.

Church of St John (ruin)

History
St John's church seems to have been a late medieval foundation, since the first rector (priest in charge) was recorded in 1304 and the surviving fabric is of that period.
It was still in use in 1535, but abandoned by 1552. However, because the priest-in-charge was a rector, he had a guaranteed income from the property, so a rector were appointed to the ruined church until 1723. The post was a sinecure.

In about 1750, the antiquary Francis Blomefield paid a visit, and found that some poor people were living in huts within the ruin.

Description
The ruin is in a field south of St John's Farm. There is no public access, although it is visible at a distance from the lane.

What remains is the tower, and a fragment of the north wall of the nave, which is the same as in the 18th century when Francis Blomefield visited. Attached to the tower on both sides are remains of the nave west wall. The plan of the rest of the church is not discernible in the grass, but Blomefield estimated the building to have been  in length.

The tower is in flint, with ashlar dressings. All the accessible stonework has been robbed, leaving gaping voids where the tower arch and a large west window used to be. The nave roofline is still obvious, with a string course running round the tower at its gutter level. Above this, the corner quoins are mostly intact. A narrower string course runs round at the sill level of the sound-holes, but the stonework of these has been robbed and the top of the tower is missing. Putlog holes are obvious.

The ruin is a Grade II listed building.

Methodist chapel
The former Methodist chapel is on the lane to Shingham. It is now a private house.

The chapel edifice is on a rectangular plan, with two deep bays in red brick and having a steeply pitched slate roof. The far bay has two single-light Gothic windows in each side, but the near one has an entrance porch replacing the far right hand side window. The bays are separated by a pair of pilasters in yellow brick. The same material edges the windows in a crenelated pattern, but the pointed tops are in stone.

The porch is enclosed with its own roof, a pointed doorway and a small Gothic window in each side, these three similarly lined with yellow brickwork which also lines the gable. A pair of yellow brick pilasters occupies the corners, supporting the gable and having a single line of decorative beadwork on their imposts. This beadwork also embellishes the gable in two rows.

The west end faces the road, while the east end abuts ancillary accommodation. The former has a large window of three Gothic lancets, the top and separating mullions being of limestone while the sides are in the same yellow brickwork as the other windows. Below is a set of three stone commemorative tablets. Here also there is a pair of yellow brick corner pilasters, and yellow brickwork lining the gable with a double row of beadwork.

Crosses

The village is unusual in having two wayside crosses. Both are Grade II Listed Buildings.

The central one is close to the east wall of the churchyard, near the phone box. It has been moved twice. In 1984 it was moved again, to the present site. A G for “Glebe” is incised on the south-east face of the socket stone.

The northern cross is located just west of the junction of Chestnut Walk and the Swaffham Road, just north of the roadway here. However, this cross has been moved as well. Originally it stood on a low mound nearer the road, but was knocked over by a cart in 1910 and so moved back. The mound has vanished. The socket stone is about  square, and has sunk into the ground.

Listed buildings

The parish has nine listed buildings. The churches of St Mary and St Botolph are Grade I. The two ruined churches are Grade II, as are the phone box and the two crosses. Two pairs of the semi-detached estate cottages around the green, built by John Motteux in 1832, have been listed. These are numbers 26–27, and 28–29.

Beachamwell Hall of 1906, with its late 18th-century stables, is not listed. Neither is Beachamwell School, south of the church, from 1835 but extended in 1875.

War Memorial
Beachamwell's War Memorial takes the form of a marble plaque located inside St. Mary the Virgin Church. It holds the following name for the Second Boer War:
 Sergeant Claxon J. Mason (d.1901), Marshall's Horse

And, the following for the First World War:
 Private Newton Watts (1897-1917), 1st Battalion, Cambridgeshire Regiment
 Private Edward J. Butters (d.1915), 1st Battalion, Essex Regiment
 Private Bertie E. Patterson (d.1915), 1st Battalion, Essex Regiment
 Private Robert H. Secker (d.1915), 1st Battalion, Essex Regiment
 Private W. J. Couzens (1896-1915), 1st Battalion, Royal Norfolk Regiment
 Private W. C. Billman (d.1916), 7th Battalion, Royal Norfolk Regiment
 Private Albert Burrell (1892-1916), 7th Battalion, Royal Norfolk Regiment
 G. Burt
 J. A. Butters
 E. C. Howard
 J. W. Johnson
 F. Nicholls

And, the following for the Second World War:
 Sergeant John F. Howes (d.1942), No. 218 (Gold Coast) Squadron RAF
 Private Alan M. Lambert (1922-1944), 1st Battalion, Royal Norfolk Regiment
 Private Stephen A. Osborn (1921-1944), 5th Battalion, Royal Norfolk Regiment
 Corporal Ivy Watson, Auxiliary Territorial Service

Notes

External links

Parish Council Website
 Group 4 News Website, Beachamwell History page]
Norfolk Heritage Explorer, Beachamwell Parish Summary
Norfolk Churches website, Beachamwell St Mary page.
St Mary's on the European Round Tower Churches Website
GENUKI Norfolk, Beachamwell page
GENUKI Norfolk, Shingham page

Villages in Norfolk
Civil parishes in Norfolk
Breckland District